Mirage is an album by vibraphonist Bobby Hutcherson featuring performances recorded in 1991 and released on Orrin Keepnews' Landmark label.

Reception

On Allmusic, Scott Yanow observed "This quartet date by Bobby Hutcherson works quite well due to the chemistry between the vibist and pianist Tommy Flanagan. ... Everything clicks on this inspired outing".

Track listing
All compositions by Bobby Hutcherson except where noted.
 "Nascimento" (Barry Harris) – 6:07
 "Mirage" – 5:46
 "Beyond the Bluebird" (Tommy Flanagan) – 7:01
 "Pannonica" (Thelonious Monk) – 7:40
 "Del Valle" – 7:06
 "I Am in Love" (Cole Porter) – 7:00
 "Zingaro" (Antônio Carlos Jobim, Chico Buarque) – 6:27
 "Ground Work" (Cedar Walton) – 5:23
 "Love Letters" (Victor Young, Edward Heyman) – 4:02
 "Heroes" (Billy Childs) – 6:51

Personnel
Bobby Hutcherson – vibraphone, marimba
Tommy Flanagan - piano
Peter Washington – bass (tracks 1-3, 5-8 & 10)
Billy Drummond – drums (tracks 1-3, 5-8 & 10)

References

Landmark Records albums
Bobby Hutcherson albums
1991 albums
Albums produced by Orrin Keepnews